"Doesn't Somebody Want to Be Wanted" is a song written by Mike Appel, Jim Cretecos, and Wes Farrell and was recorded by The Partridge Family for their 1971 album, Up to Date.

Background
Lead singer David Cassidy hated the song and didn't think it was very good.  In addition, he hated the idea of speaking aloud in the middle of the song. He hated it so much, he refused to do it.

His refusal caused consternation with the studio and the record company, where the heads of both Bell Records and Screen Gems, both owned by Columbia Pictures, got involved.  Shooting of The Partridge Family was stopped so his manager and agent could talk to him over the issue.  It was suggested to Cassidy that the song would achieve greater commercial success with the spoken interlude included.

Cassidy finally caved in to the collective pressure and recorded the song as requested.  When it was finished, he begged them not to release it: "It was horrible, I was embarrassed by it. I still can't listen to that record."

Reception
Cash Box described the song as being "an even more intriguing bit of material" than "I Think I Love You".

Chart performance
The song went to #6 on The Billboard Hot 100 in 1971 and was on the charts for 12 weeks.

The song went to #1 in Canada. The song also reached #6 in France and #9 in Australia. It was named the #13 song of 1971 on the Cashbox charts. The song was certified as a gold disc in March 1971.

Weekly charts

Year-end charts

Popular culture
 This was also the song that was playing before the Emergency Broadcast System False Alarm of 1971 on WOWO Radio.
 It is mentioned in Reservoir Dogs, as part of the fictional "K-BILLY's Super Sounds of the '70s" radio program.
 The song is featured in the episode "Never Again" of The X-Files.

References

External links
 

1971 singles
1971 songs
Songs written by Wes Farrell
The Partridge Family songs
Cashbox number-one singles
RPM Top Singles number-one singles
Bell Records singles
Songs written by Mike Appel
Song recordings produced by Wes Farrell